Bimala Prasad Chaliha College is an undergraduate college established in the year 1972 at Nagarbera of Kamrup district in Assam. The college is affiliated to Gauhati University.

Departments
Commerce (since 2018)

Arts
 Assamese
 Arabic
 Economics
 Education
 English
 Geography
 History
 Political Science

Science
 Botany
 Chemistry
 Computer Science
 Mathematics
 Physics
 Statistics
 Zoology

Accreditation
In 2016 the college has been awarded "B" grade by National Assessment and Accreditation Council (NAAC). The college is also recognised by University Grants Commission (India).

References

External links

Colleges affiliated to Gauhati University
Universities and colleges in Assam
1972 establishments in Assam
Educational institutions established in 1972